In number theory, Szpiro's conjecture relates to the conductor and the discriminant of an elliptic curve.  In a slightly modified form, it is equivalent to the well-known abc conjecture.  It is named for Lucien Szpiro, who formulated it in the 1980s. Szpiro's conjecture and its equivalent forms have been described as "the most important unsolved problem in Diophantine analysis" by Dorian Goldfeld, in part to its large number of consequences in number theory including Roth's theorem, the Mordell conjecture, the Fermat–Catalan conjecture, and Brocard's problem.

Original statement
The conjecture states that: given ε > 0, there exists a constant C(ε) such that for any elliptic curve E defined over Q with minimal discriminant Δ and conductor f, we have

Modified Szpiro conjecture
The modified Szpiro conjecture states that: given ε > 0, there exists a constant C(ε) such that for any elliptic curve E defined over Q with invariants c4, c6 and conductor f (using notation from Tate's algorithm), we have

abc conjecture
The abc conjecture originated as the outcome of attempts by Joseph Oesterlé and David Masser to understand Szpiro's conjecture, and was then shown to be equivalent to the modified Szpiro's conjecture.

Claimed proofs

In August 2012, Shinichi Mochizuki claimed a proof of Szpiro's conjecture by developing a new theory called inter-universal Teichmüller theory (IUTT). However, the papers have not been accepted by the mathematical community as providing a proof of the conjecture, with Peter Scholze and Jakob Stix concluding in March 2018 that the gap was "so severe that … small modifications will not rescue the proof strategy".

See also
 Arakelov theory

References

Bibliography
 
 
 

Conjectures
Unsolved problems in number theory